Athmane Toual (born 17 July 1984) is an Algerian footballer who plays for MC Oran in the Algerian Ligue Professionnelle 1.

Honours

Clubs
USM Bel Abbès
Algerian Cup (1): 2017–18

References

External links

1984 births
Living people
Algerian footballers
Association football goalkeepers
MC Alger players
MO Béjaïa players
USM Bel Abbès players
MC Oran players
21st-century Algerian people